Laurier was a former provincial electoral district in the Montreal region of the province of Quebec, Canada. It corresponded to the Parc-Extension neighbourhood in Montreal.

It was created for the 1966 election from parts of Laval, Montréal-Laurier, and Montréal-Outremont electoral districts.  Its final election was in 1989. It disappeared in the 1994 election and its successor electoral district was Laurier-Dorion.

It was named in honour of former Canadian Prime Minister Wilfrid Laurier.

Members of the Legislative Assembly / National Assembly

Election results
 
 

 

 

|Workers Communist
|Raymonde Lebreux
| style="text-align:right;" |469
| style="text-align:right;" |1.63  
| style="text-align:right;" |

|Independent
|Basile Papachristou
| style="text-align:right;" |263
| style="text-align:right;" |0.91
| style="text-align:right;" |
  
|Freedom of Choice
|Stephen J Smith
| style="text-align:right;" |252
| style="text-align:right;" |0.88
| style="text-align:right;" |

|Independent
|Sotirios Athanasiou
| style="text-align:right;" |73
| style="text-align:right;" |0.25
| style="text-align:right;" |
|- style="background-color:white"
! style="text-align:right;" colspan=3 |Total valid votes
! style="text-align:right;" |28,830
! style="text-align:right;" |98.67
! style="text-align:right;" |
|- style="background-color:white"
! style="text-align:right;" colspan=3 |Rejected and declined votes
! style="text-align:right;" |389
! style="text-align:right;" |1.33
! style="text-align:right;" |
|- style="background-color:white"
! style="text-align:right;" colspan=3 |Turnout
! style="text-align:right;" |29,219
! style="text-align:right;" |80.21
! style="text-align:right;" |
|- style="background-color:white"
! style="text-align:right;" colspan=3 |Electors on the lists
! style="text-align:right;" |36,428
! style="text-align:right;" |
! style="text-align:right;" |

References
 Election results (National Assembly)
 Election results (QuebecPolitique.com)

Laurier
Villeray–Saint-Michel–Parc-Extension